Ephestiodes monticolus is a species of snout moth in the genus Ephestiodes. It was described by Herbert H. Neunzig in 1990 and is known from the US state of Arizona.

References

Moths described in 1990
Phycitinae